The ADK class are a class of diesel multiple units that were previously operated by Western Australian Government Railways (WAGR) in Perth, and later Transdev Auckland on Auckland's suburban rail network, and are currently operated by MetroBus in Maputo, Mozambique. Originally built by Commonwealth Engineering and the Midland Railway Workshops for WAGR in the late 1960s, all but one were sold in 1993 to New Zealand Rail, and were then owned by Auckland Transport. The units were completely withdrawn from service in New Zealand on 5 December 2014, following completion of electrification of Auckland's network.

History
In 1967 and 1968, ten two-carriage stainless steel sets were manufactured for the Western Australian Government Railways. Each set consisted of an ADK power car manufactured by Commonwealth Engineering, and an ADB trailer built by the WAGR's Midland Railway Workshops. The ADK cars were manufactured in Granville and railed via Melbourne and Adelaide requiring a change of bogies at each of these locations and again at Kalgoorlie.

Following the electrification of the Perth rail network, they were rendered surplus and in 1992, all except ADK 689 were sold, along with the newer ADL/ADC class, to New Zealand Rail to replace 56-foot carriages on suburban trains in Auckland.

In October 1993, prior to being privatised, New Zealand Rail sold the class to the Auckland Regional Council (ARC).
In 2004, the ARC funded an upgrade, which included refurbishment of the interiors, painting in the new MAXX blue colour scheme and mechanical improvements to extend their life by 10 years. After the upgrade, they ran as four-car rather than two-car sets. All were refurbished except ADB 773 (in use at Lock 'n' Load paintball arena) and ADK 689 (which was not exported to New Zealand). Westrail planned on converting ADK 689 to a self-propelled track inspection carriage but this did not eventuate.

Unlike the ADL/ADC class and SA sets, the units were not fitted with Electronic Train Protection (ETP) equipment, owing to their imminent replacement by the AM class. All are scheduled for withdrawal by late 2014.

, all services on the Manukau Line are operated by the AM class. As a result of this, all ADK units were placed into storage. Services to Papakura formerly run by ADKs are now run by ADLs, also displaced from the Manukau Line. A farewell trip was run by the Railway Enthusiasts Society on 16 November 2014, running on every suburban line in Auckland. The units were completely withdrawn on 20 July 2015.

Mozambique 
In August 2017, eight units were shipped to Mozambique, with one unit being purchased by the New Zealand Special Air Services for training. The shipped units are now running in Maputo, Mozambique, operated by MetroBus.

References

Citations

Bibliography

External links

Diesel multiple units of New Zealand
Diesel multiple units of Western Australia